The spikefishes (family Triacanthodidae) are ray-finned fishes related to the pufferfishes and triggerfishes. They are found in the Atlantic, Indian Ocean, and the west-central Pacific.

The spikefishes are quite variable in form, with some species having tubular snouts (greatly elongated in Halimochirurgus and Macrorhamphosodes), and others have spoon-like teeth for scraping the scales off other fishes.

While spikefish are shaped in a wide variety of different colors, sizes, and shapes, they can characterized by their similarities of having a dense body with relatively thick skin, a large amount of tiny yet spiky scales, two dorsal fins of which the first contains six spines and twelve to eighteen soft spines along the second, a rounded caudal fin, small and terminal mouth with at least 10 average sized conical teeth.

References

Tetraodontiformes
Taxa named by Theodore Gill